"Gallardo" (pronounced is a song by Nigerian singer Runtown. It was released as the lead single from his debut studio album Ghetto University (2015). The song was produced by TSpize and features vocals from Davido.

Music video
The music video for "Gallardo" was shot and directed in Nigeria by Clarence Peters. The video features cameo appearances from Patoranking, Skales and Phyno. It was uploaded to YouTube on 5 March 2014. The video also peaked at number one on MTV Base's Official Naija Top 10 chart.

Critical reception
"Gallardo" was met with positive reviews. Schizophrenic of TayoTV commented on the single, saying, "Runtown is definitely not leaving anytime soon with this classic hit here featuring Davido with Tspice  On The Beat. This song is Very Catchy with Davido Doing Judgement to the beat on his part" A writer for XSouth gave the song 8  stars out of 10, adding, "Gallardo is a party jam and Runtown impresses with this one on a good beat by Tspice. This song will get you dancing Skelewu from the beginning to the end and Davido killed this one like always. You need this song on your playlist…. it’s a destined party rocker."

Accolades
"Gallardo" won Best Collaboration of the Year at the 2014 Nigeria Entertainment Awards, held in New York City. It was nominated for Best Video by A New Act at the 2014 Nigeria Music Video Awards (NMVA).

Remix and cover
"Gallardo" was remixed by D-Plus, an up-and-coming artist from Kano State, Nigeria.

References

2014 songs
2014 singles
Davido songs
Song recordings produced by TSpize
Runtown songs
Songs written by Davido